Tai Wo Estate is a mixed TPS and public housing estate in Tai Po, New Territories, Hong Kong, near MTR Tai Wo station. It is one of the public housing estates in Tai Po that is not built on the reclaimed land. The estate consists of nine residential buildings completed in 1989. Some of the flats were sold to tenants through Tenants Purchase Scheme Phase 3 in 2000.

Po Nga Court is a Home Ownership Scheme court in Tai Po, near Tai Wo Estate. It consists of three residential buildings built in 1989.

Houses

Tai Wo Estate

Po Nga Court

Demographics
According to the 2016 by-census, Tai Wo Estate had a population of 19,979 while Po Nga Court had a population of 6,759. Altogether the population amounts to 26,738.

Politics
For the 2019 District Council election, the estate fell within two constituencies. Most of the estate is located in the Tai Wo constituency, which is represented by Olive Chan Wai-ka, while the remainder of the estate and Po Nga Court falls within the Po Nga constituency, which is represented by Chow Yuen-wai.

See also

Public housing estates in Tai Po
 Tai Wo#Recent years

References

Residential buildings completed in 1989
Public housing estates in Hong Kong
Tenants Purchase Scheme
Tai Po